Caroline Chikezie (born 19 February 1974) is a British Nigerian actress, best known for playing Sasha Williams in As If, and Elaine Hardy in Footballers' Wives. In recent years she has gained popularity as Angela Ochello in the Nigerian series The Governor.

Early life and background
Chikezie was born in England to Nigerian parents of Igbo origin. At fourteen, Chikezie was sent to boarding school in Nigeria in an attempt to make her abandon her dreams to become an actress. Before this, she had attended weekend classes at Italia Conti. On her return to the United Kingdom, she enrolled at Brunel University where she studied Medicinal Chemistry (she was expected to take over her father's hospital in Nigeria), but dropped out of school. She later won a scholarship to the UK's Academy of Live and Recorded Arts.

Television
After roles in Holby City, Casualty, and the award-winning British film Babymother, Chikezie landed her first major role as bitchy Sasha Williams in As If in 2001. In 2004 she landed a regular role as Kyle Pascoe's girlfriend Elaine Hardy in Series Three of Footballer's Wives.

Other television work includes 40, Judas Kiss, Free Fall, and Brothers and Sisters.

She appeared as Lisa Hallett, a member of the secret organisation of Torchwood who had been transformed into a half-human half-Cyberman in "Cyberwoman", an episode of Torchwood, and as Tamara, a fellow demon hunter, in the 3rd-season premiere of Supernatural. In 2018, she starred as a recurring character, Queen Tamlin of Leah in the 2nd season of Shannara Chronicles.

She also starred as Angela Ochello in the hit EbonyLife Television series "The Governor."

Film
As a film actress, Chikezie appeared as Nasuada in the movie Eragon. She spoke about her representation in the movie passage.

Filmography

References

External links

1974 births
Living people
Alumni of the Academy of Live and Recorded Arts
English people of Igbo descent
21st-century Nigerian actresses
Black British actresses
Actresses from London
Igbo actresses
21st-century English women
21st-century English people
Nigerian film actresses